Zhu Jiayi (born 31 January 1999) is a Chinese footballer currently playing as a defender for Chongqing Liangjiang.

Career statistics

Club
.

References

1999 births
Living people
Chinese footballers
Association football defenders
China League One players
Shanghai Port F.C. players
Inner Mongolia Zhongyou F.C. players
21st-century Chinese people